Ridgewood Farm is a historic farm complex and national historic district located in Cumru Township, Berks County, Pennsylvania.  It has eight contributing buildings and five contributing structures.  They are a two-story, vernacular Federal sandstone farmhouse (c. 1810); sandstone Pennsylvania bank barn (1809); sandstone summer kitchen / butcher house; 1 1/2-story, sandstone produce storage building (1810); ground cellar; stone wall; and other outbuildings. Also on the property are the remains of the Schuylkill Canal that operated from 1924 to 1932, and two railroad lines.

It was listed on the National Register of Historic Places in 1992.

Gallery

References

Farms on the National Register of Historic Places in Pennsylvania
Historic districts on the National Register of Historic Places in Pennsylvania
Federal architecture in Pennsylvania
Houses completed in 1810
Houses in Berks County, Pennsylvania
National Register of Historic Places in Berks County, Pennsylvania
1809 establishments in Pennsylvania